José Raymundo del Río (1783–1866) was a Chilean politician during the years of organization of the state of Chile. He was minister of the Supreme Director Ramon Freire and under the presidencies of Agustín Eyzaguirre, Ramon Freire, Francisco Antonio Pinto, Francisco Ramón Vicuña, José Tomás Ovalle and Manuel Bulnes. He was the son Gaspar del Río y Arcaya and Nieves de la Cruz y Goyeneche.

Political career
During Chile's War of Independence he joined the patriotic side, commanding army volunteers. After the reconquest of Chile he was exiled to Mendoza and when he was informed of Chile's independence he returned to the country. He made donations to the government for undertaking the Liberation Expedition to Peru.

During his political career he functioned as deputy secretary of finance and senior officer. He took over in 1823 as alternate for Senator Concepción (Chile) but was never called to be incorporated. He was also running civilian member in the Great Convention.

As deputy secretary he had to be acting deputy or interim minister of finance in different periods and separately from 1825 to 1842.
He left political life as he was slowly beginning to lose his sight. He died blind in 1866.

References 

1783 births
1866 deaths
Members of the Senate of Chile